Joy FM 105.7 (DXIA 105.7 MHz) is an FM station owned by Iddes Broadcast Group and operated by YAKI (Yaman Ang Kalusugan Ingatan) Company, Inc. Its studios and transmitter are located at Brgy. Paco, Kidapawan.

References

External links
Joy FM FB Page
Joy FM Website

Radio stations in Cotabato
Radio stations established in 2013